John Richard Baldwin (May 10, 1854 – May 1, 1897) was a Massachusetts politician who served in the Massachusetts State Senate and as the 20th Mayor of Lynn, Massachusetts.

Early life and career
Baldwin was born in Lynn, Massachusetts on May 10, 1854.  Baldwin attended the Lynn public schools and Harvard College graduating in 1877.  Baldwin was admitted as to the Massachusetts Bar in 1880. From 1880 on Baldwin practiced law in Lynn, first under the firm name of Baldwin & Baker, and, after dissolving that partnership in 1885, he worked as a solo legal practitioner.

On December 27, 1883, Baldwin married Elizabeth A. Merritt, the couple had three daughters Helen Elizabeth Baldwin, Esther Merritt Baldwin, and Mary Converse Baldwin; and two sons, John R. Baldwin, Jr., and Richard Burrill Baldwin.

Public service
In 1879 Baldwin was elected to the Lynn School Committee, and he was re-elected in 1882. Baldwin served on the School Committee for six years and was its chairman from 1881 to 1882.

Notes

1854 births
Harvard College alumni
Massachusetts state senators
Mayors of Lynn, Massachusetts
1897 deaths
19th-century American politicians